Global Underground 032: Adam Freeland, Mexico City is a DJ mix album in the Global Underground series, compiled and mixed by DJ and producer Adam Freeland, a pioneer of the English breakbeat scene. This is the first Global Underground mix for Adam Freeland.  The two disc mix album features a wide variety of genres ranging from electropop to breaks to the glitchy techno of James Holden.

Track listing

Disc One
Faze Action - "In the Trees (Carl Craig C2 Remix #1)"
Revl9n - "Walking Machine (SebastiAn Remix)"
Etienne De Crecy - "F***"
Kim - Wet N Wild (Midnight Juggernauts Mix)
Mr. Oizo - "Half an Edit"
Adam Freeland - "Silverlake Pills"
Kim - "By the Time They Reach You (Bagraiders Mix)"
Jape - "Floating (Alex Metric Remix)"
Beauty School - "Disco Sux (Stone Lions Mix)"
Oliver Huntemann - "37°"
Justice - "Phantom"
Minimal Compact - "Deadly Weapons (Optimo Mix)"
DJ Mehdi - "Signatune (Thomas Bangalter Edit)"/Spank Rock - "Bump (Switch Remix)"
Phones - "Sharpen the Knives"
Trabant - "The One (Para One Remix)"
Kavinsky - "Testarossa (SebastiAn Remix)"
Evil 9 - "Happy Ending"

Disc Two
Spacemen 3 – "Ecstasy Symphony"
My My - "Butterflies & Zebras"
Lee Jones - "There Comes a Time (Prins Thomas Miks)"
Justus Kohncke - "Advance"
120 days - "Come Out, Come Down, Fade Out, Be Gone"
Gui Boratto - "Terminal"
Holden - "Lump"
Cobblestone Jazz - "Dump Truck"
Silversun Pickups - "Lazy Eye (Adam Freeland Re-Edit)"
Substance & Vainqueur - "Immersion"
Fujiya & Miyagi - "Ankle Injuries"
Andrew Weatherall - "Feathers"
B-Movie - "Nowhere Girl (Adam Freeland Mix)"
Mylo - "Paris 400 (Aswefall Remix)"
Adam Freeland - "Self Indulgent Ending"

References

External links 

Global Underground
2007 compilation albums
2007 live albums